Motza Illit is a community settlement in central Israel. Located on a picturesque slope overlooking the Jerusalem Mountains, Ein Karem, the Motza Valley and Jerusalem, it falls under the jurisdiction of Mateh Yehuda Regional Council. In  it had a population of  residents.

History
Settlement in the area goes back to ancient times, with thousands of year old terraces and archeological remains in the area. In 1929, old Motza was attacked by its Arab neighbors and many residents were murdered. Four years later (in 1933), a new moshav, Motza Ilit, was established at a higher location on the same slope.

In January 1934, a house-warming party was held by twenty Jewish families who had built homes in Motza Illit with the aid of the Jewish National Council ("Va'ad Leumi") and emergency funds.

Motza Illit overlooks the Judean mountains, the churches and monasteries of Ein Karem, the Beit Zayit water reservoir and the Jerusalem Forest.

It has three secular kindergartens. Elementary school children study at the Ein Harim Elementary School near the Beit Zayit water reservoir. For secondary school, Motza Illit's children study at a range of local secondary schools (Ein Karem Secondary School) and in Jerusalem (University Secondary School, Boyer, Science and Arts Secondary School, Academy for Music and Dance and more).

Notable residents
David Kaminsky (born 1938), basketball player and coach
Ehud Olmert
Anna Ticho

Gallery

References

Community settlements
Former moshavim
Populated places established in 1933
Populated places in Jerusalem District
1933 establishments in Mandatory Palestine